Yalisumni is a former Nisenan settlement in El Dorado County, California. It was located near Salmon Falls on the south side of the South Fork of the American River; its precise location is unknown.

It was a source of workers for John Sutter's New Helvetia settlement, located in present-day Sacramento between Yalisumni and another Nisenan settlement, Pujuni.

References

Former settlements in El Dorado County, California
Former populated places in California
Maidu villages
Lost Native American populated places in the United States